The 1992 Lao League was the third recorded season of top flight football in Laos. Lao Army FC won the championship, their third consecutive championship.

References

Lao Premier League seasons
Laos
Laos
1